The Chats are an Australian rock band that formed in 2016 in Sunshine Coast, Queensland. The band is composed of singer and bassist Eamon Sandwith, drummer Matt Boggis, and guitarist Josh Hardy.

The Chats have released two studio albums, two extended plays, one compilation album, and 11 singles. 

The Chats released their first album High Risk Behaviour through Bargain Bin Records in 2020 and their second album, Get Fucked being released in 2022.

Albums

Studio albums

Compilation albums

Extended plays

Singles

Album appearances

Music videos

Notes

References 

Rock music group discographies
Discographies of Australian artists